Cristiano da Silva Vidal (born 23 August 1996), commonly known as Vidal, is a Brazilian professional footballer who plays as a right back for Ferroviária.

Professional career
Vidal made his professional debut with Juventude in a 1-0 Campeonato Gaúcho win over Passo Fundo on 5 February 2017.

References

External links
 

1996 births
Living people
Sportspeople from Rio Grande do Sul
Brazilian footballers
Association football fullbacks
Goiás Esporte Clube players
Esporte Clube Juventude players
Campeonato Brasileiro Série A players
Campeonato Brasileiro Série B players
Campeonato Brasileiro Série C players
Grêmio Esportivo Brasil players
Associação Ferroviária de Esportes players